Verse (ayah) 256 of Al-Baqara is a very famous verse in the Islamic scripture, the Quran. The verse includes the phrase that "there is no compulsion in religion". Immediately after making this statement, the Quran offers a rationale for it: Since the revelation has, through explanation, clarification, and repetition, clearly distinguished the path of guidance from the path of misguidance, it is now up to people to choose the one or the other path. This verse comes right after the Throne Verse.

The overwhelming majority of Muslim scholars consider that verse to be a Medinan one, when Muslims lived in their period of political ascendance, and to be non abrogated, including Ibn Taymiyya, Ibn Qayyim, Al-Tabari, Abi ʿUbayd, Al-Jaṣṣās, Makki bin Abi Talib, Al-Nahhas, Ibn Jizziy, Al-Suyuti, Ibn Ashur, Mustafa Zayd, and many others. According to all the theories of language elaborated by Muslim legal scholars, the Quranic proclamation that 'There is no compulsion in religion. The right path has been distinguished from error' is as absolute and universal a statement as one finds, and so under no condition should an individual be forced to accept a religion or belief against his or her will according to the Quran.

The meaning of the principle that there is no compulsion in religion was not limited to freedom of individuals to choose their own religion. Islam also provided non-Muslims with considerable economic, cultural, and administrative rights.

Text and meaning

Text and transliteration
Hafs from Aasim ibn Abi al-Najud

 

Warsh from Nafiʽ al-Madani

Meanings

Let there be no compulsion in religion, for the truth stands out clearly from falsehood. So whoever renounces false gods and believes in God has certainly grasped the firmest, unfailing hand-hold. And God is All-Hearing, All-Knowing.

Let there be no compulsion in religion: Truth stands out clear from Error: whoever rejects evil and believes in Allah hath grasped the most trustworthy hand-hold, that never breaks. And Allah heareth and knoweth all things.

There shall be no compulsion in [acceptance of] the religion. The right course has become clear from the wrong. So whoever disbelieves in Taghut and believes in  has grasped the most trustworthy handhold with no break in it. And  is Hearing and Knowing.

Context
According to some commentators, the verse was only directed towards a small group of residents of Medina. During the time of prophet, a boy from one of the Muslim families, who had been educated in the town's Jewish schools, decided to depart with the Jewish tribe being expelled from Medina. His distraught parents were told by the Prophet in this verse that they could not compel their son to stay.
 It is reported that Mujahid said that "This verse was revealed about a man of the Helpers who had a black boy called Subayh whom he used to coerce to become Muslim".

In all cases, following the famous maxim  (Consideration is  granted to the Generality of the Language, not to the Specificity of the Reason [for Revelation]) it is concluded that the verse is general in meaning, and thus the verse has been understood over the centuries as a general command that people cannot be forced to convert to Islam.

Discussion

Relevance to apostasy

According to Khaled Abou El Fadl, and other scholars such as S. A. Rahman, the phrase "there is no compulsion in religion" from verse Q.2:256 enunciates a general, overriding principle that cannot be contradicted by isolated traditions attributed to the Prophet and that the verse indicates that Quran never intended a punishment for apostasy in this life.

Other Islamic scholars disagree. First, the "no compulsion" phrase should not be used out of context and all exegesis of Quran that is "linear-atomistic" analysis of one small phrase in one verse is flawed. The complete verse and nearby verses should be read to understand the "complex hermeneutic totality" of context for anything in Quran.

It is reported that Mujahid said that "This verse was revealed about a man of the Helpers [Ansar of Medina] who had a black boy called Subayh whom he used to coerce to become Muslim".  In addition scholar argue, no single phrase or verse in Quran is less or more relevant in Islam than other phrases or verses in Quran; and other verses in Quran such as verse 66 of At-Tawba state "Make ye no excuses: ye have rejected Faith after ye had accepted it. If We pardon some of you, We will punish others amongst you, for that they are in sin.", As well as "Say, "The truth is from your Lord": Let him who will believe, and let him who will, reject (it): ...", "And if your Lord had pleased, surely all those who are in the earth would have believed, all of them; will you then force men till they become believers?", "Therefore do remind, for you are only a reminder. You are not a watcher over them;", "He said: "O my people! See ye if (it be that) I have a Clear Sign from my Lord, and that He hath sent Mercy unto me from His own presence, but that the Mercy hath been obscured from your sight? shall we compel you to accept it when ye are averse to it?". According to some western scholars, in the history of Islamic exegesis scholarship, that verse is considered as an early revelation, and abrogated by verses that were revealed to Muhammad at a later stage in his life. However, as stated by the famous British orientalist Sir Thomas Walker Arnold the verse in question is a Medinan verse, when Muslims lived in their period of political ascendance. Moreover, Muslim scholars have established the abrogated verses and Q.2:256 isn't among them. Finally, to understand the Quran, the sayings and actions of Muhammad as recorded in Hadith collections are considered by Islamic scholars. Taken together, the vast majority of Islamic scholars of every fiqh have traditionally held with the position that there should be punishment for apostasy in Islam.

Ibn Kathir's interpretation
The Quran commentator (Muffasir) Ibn Kathir, a Sunni, suggests that the verse implies that Muslims should not force anyone to convert to Islam since the truth of Islam is so self-evident that no one is in need of being coerced into it,

Kashani's interpretation 
Kashani, a Sufi, interprets Q.2:256 as follows

Verses relating to Quran 2:256 
A number of verses relate to Quran 2:256 and this includes, 

These verses indicate that compulsion is strictly prohibited.

See also
Apostasy in Islam

References

Quranic verses
Al-Baqara
Sharia